Jean-François Delassus (born 1942) is a French journalist and documentaries director. He has been working for France Inter and Europe 1 and was Far East correspondent for Le Figaro.

Distinctions 
 1971: Prix Albert-Londres for Le Japon : Monstre ou modèle.

Works

Documentaries 

1977 – Foch pour vaincre
1978 – Lazare Carnot : le glaive de la révolution
1978 – La banqueroute de Law
1979 – Ann Dollwood
1979 – Bernard Quesnay
1981 – L'Âge d'aimer
1982 – Le pouvoir d'inertie
1987 – Race for the Bomb
1988 – L'Argent du mur
1989 – Lundi Noir
1992 – Fusion
1994 – La Bataille du riz
1994 – La bataille du charbon
1995 – Plus chaud que mille volcans
1995 – Nous irons tous à l'Elysée
1995 – Le Siège de la Rochelle : les grandes batailles du passé
1995 – Alsace-Vegas
1996 – Hitler Staline : liaisons dangereuses
1996 – Hoover, le plus grand ripou d'Amérique
1996 – Le Fils de l'ours
1999 – Les Mystères des pyramides
1999 – Les Hommes en noir
2000 – Une sacrée vacherie
2001 – Les Mystères des cathédrales
2002 – 
2002 – Au temps de l'Empire Romain
2003 – Au temps de Charlemagne
2003 – Au temps des croisades
2004 – Luther contre le pape
2004 – La Tempête du siècle : 26 décembre 1999 with 
2005 – Dunkerque : la dernière forteresse d'Hitler
2006 – Austerlitz : la victoire en marchant
2006 – Les Derniers jours de Anouar el Sadat
2007 – Les Derniers jours de Marlon Brando
2008 – 14–18 : le bruit et la fureur
2008 – L'affaire Farewell
2009 – Les dernières heures du mur
2011 – Le Front populaire, à nous la vie
2015 – Délivrance. Noël 1944 – 8 mai 1945, une fin de guerre

External links
 
 Les bricolages d’archives de Jean-François Delassus on Déjà vu hypothèses
 Jean-François Delassus, auteur d'un documentaire sur le Vietnam : "La réalité, je la provoque" on Télérama (19 April 2015)
 Première Guerre Mondiale : 1916, L'enfer de Verdun on YouTube
 Jean-François Delassus on data.bnf.fr

French directors
French screenwriters
20th-century French journalists
21st-century French journalists
Albert Londres Prize recipients
1942 births
Living people